Nora is a locality and the seat of Nora Municipality, Örebro County, Sweden with 6,526 inhabitants in 2010.

History
Nora received its charter in 1643. The government had requested the inhabitants of both Nora and the adjacent town Lindesberg to move together into a newly chartered city called Järle. However, the government proved unsuccessful, and instead granted both Nora and Lindesberg independent charters at that year.

Many wooden houses built in the 18th and 19th century have been spared from fires and demolition, making the town Nora one of Sweden's best preserved wooden towns. Eksjö and Hjo are two other examples, and they have together with Nora initiated a wooden-town development project.
Also part of the old city structure are cobbled streets with small houses and shops by small windling street.  Anna Maria Lenngren, a Swedish poet, once proclaimed "Så liten stad, så mycket smak" (Such small town, so much flavor).

The first normal gauge railway in Sweden was opened to the public in 1856 between Nora and Ervalla. It is today a museum railway, worked by a preservation society.

See also 
Nora, Indianapolis

References 

Populated places in Örebro County
Populated places in Nora Municipality
Municipal seats of Örebro County
Swedish municipal seats
Bergslagen
Populated places established in 1643
1643 establishments in Sweden